Patricia Connolly  (born August 1958) is a Scottish biomedical engineer whose expertise concerns the development of bioelectronic devices for medical diagnostics and monitoring. She is a professor of biomedical engineering at the University of Strathclyde, the director of the Strathclyde Institute of Medical Devices, deputy associate principal of the university, joint lead for the university's HealthTech Cluster, founding CEO of Strathclyde spinout corporation Ohmedics Ltd, and a member of the board of directors of the Association of British HealthTech Industries.

Education and career
Connolly is original from Glasgow. After completing her PhD at the University of Strathclyde in 1984, she became a lecturer and then senior lecturer at the University of Glasgow from 1984 to 1992. She left academic for industry in 1992, and in Italy and Switzerland developing medical diagnostic devices. She returned to Glasgow in 1999 to take a newly created Chair in Bioengineering at the University of Strathclyde.

Recognition
Connolly was elected to the Fellowship of the Royal Society of Edinburgh in 2005. In 2014 she was named a Fellow of the Royal Academy of Engineering.

References

External links
Faculty profile

1958 births
Living people
British bioengineers
British women engineers
Engineers from Glasgow
Alumni of the University of Strathclyde
Academics of the University of Glasgow
Academics of the University of Strathclyde
Fellows of the Royal Society of Edinburgh
Fellows of the Royal Academy of Engineering
Female Fellows of the Royal Academy of Engineering